Grant Sasser (born February 13, 1964) is an American former professional ice hockey player who played three games in the National Hockey League.  He played for the Pittsburgh Penguins and was the first Oregon native to participate in an NHL game. Sasser played junior hockey for the hometown Portland Winterhawks.

Awards
 WHL West Second All-Star Team – 1984

References

External links

Sasser's hockeydraftcentral.com bio

1964 births
American men's ice hockey centers
Baltimore Skipjacks players
Living people
Sportspeople from Portland, Oregon
Muskegon Lumberjacks players
Pittsburgh Penguins players
Pittsburgh Penguins draft picks
Portland Winterhawks players
Ice hockey people from Oregon